Australian rock band AC/DC, have released 18 studio albums (15 available worldwide and two released only in Australia), two soundtrack albums, three live albums, one extended play, 48 singles, 11 video albums, 58 music videos and two box sets. Although many AC/DC singles have been released, the band always refused to release any greatest hits-type packages; Who Made Who (which served as the soundtrack to Stephen King's Maximum Overdrive), Iron Man 2, and the band's various live recordings are as close as the group have come to such a compilation. Verizon makes AC/DC albums available to download, but for several years the band refused to release their albums on iTunes, as iTunes normally allows downloading of individual tracks; AC/DC publicly stated: "Our... reason is that we honestly believe the songs on any of our albums belong together. If we were on iTunes, we know a certain percentage of people would only download two or three songs from the album – and we don't think that represents us musically." However, the band finally released their entire discography to iTunes in November 2012. On 30 June 2015 their catalog appeared on Spotify for the first time.

Brothers, Angus and Malcolm Young formed AC/DC in 1973. The band released two albums in Australia before releasing their first international effort, High Voltage with vocalist Bon Scott, bassist Mark Evans and drummer Phil Rudd. In 1980, less than a year after the release of the successful Highway to Hell, Bon Scott died and was replaced by British singer Brian Johnson, with whom AC/DC released their best-selling album, Back in Black. Their album Black Ice, released in 2008, reached number one in 29 countries. In 47 years of their career, AC/DC sold over 200 million albums worldwide, roughly 75 million in the US. Back in Black alone sold 25 million copies (50 million worldwide), and went on to become the second highest-selling album in history.

Albums

Studio albums

Live albums

Soundtrack albums

Box set albums

Extended plays

Singles

Notes
 A. The Official Charts Company views the move from WMG to Sony Music in the same way as records being re-issued, with "Highway to Hell" first charting on Columbia on 1 December 2012 and peaking at number 4 as part of a Christmas campaign a year later. 
 B. Promotional airplay single in Australia and the UK.

Tribute compilations
 Thunderbolt: A Tribute to AC/DC (De Rock/1996 US, Canada) (Universal Music Artists/1998 Australia) 
 Covered in Black: An Industrial Tribute To The Kings Of High Voltage AC/DC (Cleopatra 1997)
 Thunderbolot Tribute to AC/DC (Triage/1997 Japan)
 Hell Ain't a Bad Place To Be: A Tribute to the Kings of High Voltage AC/DC (Reptilian 1999)
 Oi Oi - A Tribute to AC/DC 7-inch EP (Flat 1999)
 AC/DC Hometown Tribute (Oracle 2000)
 Back in Black (A Tribute to AC/DC) (Zebra 2000)
 For Those About to Rot: Tribute to AC/DC (Dwell 2000)
 Remixed to Hell: A Tribute to AC/DC (Cleopatra 2000)
 A Tribute To AC/DC - Back In Black (Metrodome 2000)
 Bon Appetite: Tribute to the Bon Scott Years of AC/DC (Perris 2002)
 For Those About to Rawk: A Punk Tribute to AC/DC (Legacy Entertainment 2002)
 Let There Be Metal: A Tribute to AC/DC (Artillery Music 2002)
 Voltage Overload: Tribute to AC/DC (Shark Bite 2003)
 The World's Greatest AC/DC Tribute (Zebra 2004)
 Back in Bluegrass: The Bluegrass Tribute to AC/DC (CMH 2005)
 Back in Black: A Tribute to AC/DC (Dressed to Kill 2007)
 High Voltage Box: The Ultimate AC/DC Tribute 2XCD (Deadline 2007)
 Hip-Hop Tribute to AC/DC: Ultimate Mash-Up (Tribute Sounds 2007)
 An Instrumental Tribute to AC/DE (2007)
 Punk Rock Tribute to AC/DC (Legacy Entertainment 2008)
 The Ultimate AC/DC Tribute 2XCD (Double Pleasure 2008)
 TNT: The Most Explosive Tribute to AC/DC 2XCD (Cherry Red 2009)
 Back in Black - Redux: A Tribute To AC/DC (Classic Rock 2010)
 Rock & Roll Train: A Millenium Tribute to AC/DC 2XCD (Versailles 2011)
 The Many Faces Of AC/DC|The Ultimate Tribute To AC/DC 3XCD (Music Brokers 2012)
 If You Want Strum, You've Got It: A Tribute To AC/DC (Oarfin Distribution 2013)
 Back in Blue: Blues Tribute to AC/DC 2XCD (Only Blues 2016)
 Highway to Hell: A Tribute to AC/DC & Bon Scott 1974-1979 (Versailles 2017)
 For Those About To Brazil...The Brazilian Tribute to AC/DC 2XCD (Secret Service 2018)
 A Tribute to AC/CD (Metal Hammer 2019) - free w/ German magazine issue Dec. 2019
 Ultimate AC/DC Tribute (Golden Core 2019)

Videos

Video albums

Music videos

See also
 List of best-selling albums
 List of best-selling music artists

References

General
 
 
Specific

Further reading

External links
 
 

Discography
Discographies of Australian artists
Rock music group discographies